The 1997 Wimbledon Championships was a tennis tournament played on grass courts at the All England Lawn Tennis and Croquet Club in Wimbledon, London in the United Kingdom. It was the 111th edition of the Wimbledon Championships and was held from 23 June to 6 July 1997.

The championships saw the inauguration of a new No. 1 Court, the third court to be named such in the club's history. To commemorate the new stadium, all the three-time or more singles champions were invited to a ceremony marking the opening of the new court and were presented with a silver salver. Ten of the thirteen surviving eligible champions attended: Louise Brough, Rod Laver, Margaret Court, Billie Jean King, John Newcombe, Chris Evert, Martina Navratilova, John McEnroe, Boris Becker and Pete Sampras. The only surviving absentees were Maria Bueno and Björn Borg who declined to attend and Steffi Graf who was recovering from knee surgery and unable to be present. The first match played on the new court was between Tim Henman and Daniel Nestor.

For only the second time in the tournament history (after the 1991 edition), Wimbledon saw play during the Middle Sunday, after 3 days of suspension due to rain.

Prize money
The total prize money for 1997 championships was £6,884,952. The winner of the men's title earned £415,000 while the women's singles champion earned £373,500.

* per team

Champions

Seniors

Men's singles

 Pete Sampras defeated  Cédric Pioline, 6–4, 6–2, 6–4
 It was Sampras' 10th career Grand Slam singles title and his 4th title at Wimbledon.

Women's singles

 Martina Hingis defeated  Jana Novotná, 2–6, 6–3, 6–3
 It was Hingis' 2nd career Grand Slam singles title and her 1st and only title at Wimbledon.

Men's doubles

 Todd Woodbridge /  Mark Woodforde defeated  Jacco Eltingh /  Paul Haarhuis, 7–6(7–4), 7–6(9–7), 5–7, 6–3
 It was Woodbridge's 14th career Grand Slam doubles title and his 6th title at Wimbledon. It was Woodforde's 15th career Grand Slam doubles title and his 6th title at Wimbledon.

Women's doubles

 Gigi Fernández /  Natasha Zvereva defeated  Nicole Arendt /  Manon Bollegraf, 7–6(7–4), 6–4
 It was Fernández's 17th and last career Grand Slam doubles title and her 4th title at Wimbledon. It was Zvereva's 18th and last career Grand Slam doubles title and her 5th title at Wimbledon.

Mixed doubles

 Cyril Suk /  Helena Suková defeated  Andrei Olhovskiy /  Larisa Neiland, 4–6, 6–3, 6–4
 It was Suk's 4th and last career Grand Slam mixed doubles title and his 3rd title at Wimbledon. It was Suková's 5th and last career Grand Slam mixed doubles title and her 3rd title at Wimbledon.

Juniors

Boys' singles

 Wesley Whitehouse defeated  Daniel Elsner, 6–3, 7–6(8–6)

Girls' singles

 Cara Black defeated  Brie Rippner, 6–3, 7–5

Boys' doubles

 Luis Horna /  Nicolás Massú defeated  Jaco van der Westhuizen /  Wesley Whitehouse, 6–4, 6–2

Girls' doubles

 Cara Black /  Irina Selyutina defeated  Maja Matevžič /  Katarina Srebotnik, 3–6, 7–5, 6–3

Singles seeds

Men's singles
  Pete Sampras (champion)
  Goran Ivanišević (second round, lost to Magnus Norman)
  Yevgeny Kafelnikov (first round, lost to Nicolas Kiefer)
  Richard Krajicek (fourth round, lost to Tim Henman)
  Michael Chang (first round, lost to Todd Woodbridge)
  Thomas Muster (withdrew before the tournament began)
  Mark Philippoussis (first round, lost to Greg Rusedski)
  Boris Becker (quarterfinals, lost to Pete Sampras)
  Marcelo Ríos (fourth round, lost to Boris Becker)
  Carlos Moyá (second round, lost to Boris Becker)
  Gustavo Kuerten (first round, lost to Justin Gimelstob)
  Pat Rafter (fourth round, lost to Todd Woodbridge)
  Andriy Medvedev (third round, lost to Nicolas Kiefer)
  Tim Henman (quarterfinals, lost to Michael Stich)
  Wayne Ferreira (third round, lost to Cédric Pioline)
  Petr Korda (fourth round, lost to Pete Sampras)
  Jonas Björkman (first round, lost to Chris Wilkinson)

Women's singles
  Martina Hingis (champion)
  Monica Seles (third round, lost to Sandrine Testud)
  Jana Novotná (final, lost to Martina Hingis)
  Iva Majoli (quarterfinals, lost to Anna Kournikova)
  Lindsay Davenport (second round, lost to Denisa Chládková)
  Amanda Coetzer (second round, lost to Patricia Hy-Boulais)
  Anke Huber (third round, lost to Anna Kournikova)
  Arantxa Sánchez Vicario (semifinals, lost to Jana Novotná)
  Mary Pierce (fourth round, lost to Arantxa Sánchez Vicario)
  Conchita Martínez (third round, lost to Helena Suková)
  Mary Joe Fernández (fourth round, lost to Jana Novotná)
  Irina Spîrlea (fourth round, lost to Iva Majoli)
  Kimberly Po (first round, lost to Kerry-Anne Guse)
  Brenda Schultz-McCarthy (third round, lost to Sabine Appelmans)
  Ruxandra Dragomir (first round, lost to Andrea Glass)
  Barbara Paulus (second round, lost to Naoko Kijimuta)

References

External links
 Official Wimbledon Championships website

 
Wimbledon Championships
Wimbledon Championships
Wimbledon Championships
Wimbledon Championships